We Are All Prostitutes is a compilation album by English post-punk band The Pop Group, released in April 1998 by Radar Records. It comprises tracks from the band's second album, the compilation We Are Time and the singles We Are All Prostitutes and Where There's a Will There's a Way.

Track listing

Personnel 
Adapted from the We Are All Prostitutes liner notes.

The Pop Group
 Dan Catsis – bass guitar
 Gareth Sager – guitar, saxophone
 Bruce Smith – drums, percussion
 Mark Stewart – vocals
 John Waddington – guitar

Technical personnel
 Dave Anderson – mixing, recording
 Dennis Bovell – mixing, recording
 Disc O'Dell – mixing, recording
 The Pop Group – mixing, recording

Release history

References

External links 
 

1998 compilation albums
The Pop Group albums
Rough Trade Records compilation albums